Ornel Gega (born 24 March 1990) is a retired Albanian-born Italian rugby union player. and his position was hooker.

From 2015 to 2020 he played for Benetton. 

He was named in the Italian squad for the 2016 Six Nations Championship. He made his debut on 6 February against France He is the first Albanian-born rugby union player to have featured in a major international tournament, having played for Italy at the 2016 Six Nations Championship.

Had two outings during last season's tournament and has gone from strength to strength since then, figuring as a regular starter and producing a big display in November's victory over the Springboks.

In January 2017, he was included in the Italy squad for the 2017 Six Nations Championship, in a competition where he has played 2 games before, without scoring

References

External links
 

1990 births
Living people
People from Lezhë
People from Lezhë County
Albanian emigrants to Italy
Albanian rugby union players
Italian rugby union players
Italy international rugby union players
Rugby union hookers